Torture: Journal on Rehabilitation of Torture Victims and Prevention of Torture is a peer-reviewed medical journal on rehabilitation of torture victims and prevention of torture, published triannually by the International Rehabilitation Council for Torture Victims. 

The journal is abstracted and indexed in MEDLINE/PubMed. It was established in 1991 as Torture: Quarterly Journal on Rehabilitation of Torture Victims and Prevention of Torture and obtained its current title in 2004.

External links 

 
Pau Pérez-Sales. Editor-in-Chief

Torture
Rehabilitation medicine journals
Triannual journals
Publications established in 1991
English-language journals